Ojibway Provincial Park is about  southwest of Sioux Lookout on Highway 72 in Northwestern Ontario, Canada. On Little Vermilion Lake, the park offers swimming, a sandy beach, and muskellunge fishing. It has trails through pine forests and along the lake's shore.  The park is operated as a partnership between the Ontario government and a local community organisation, Community Living Dryden-Sioux Lookout.

See also
 List of Ontario parks

References

External links

Provincial parks of Ontario
Parks in Kenora District
Protected areas established in 1975
1975 establishments in Ontario